Puerto Rico Highway 33 (PR-33) is an urban road in Caguas, Puerto Rico. This road goes from the junction of PR-1 with PR-189 to Bulevar Cristóbal Colón, west of downtown, and it is known as Avenida José Mercado.

Major intersections

See also

 List of highways numbered 33

References

External links
 

033
Caguas, Puerto Rico